Zhang Xiangshuo (born 22 June 2001) is a Chinese footballer currently playing as a left-back or midfielder for Cangzhou Mighty Lions.

Club career
On 14 April 2021, Zhang Xiangshuo left third tier football club Shaanxi Warriors Beyond to join top tier club Cangzhou Mighty Lions. He would make his debut for his new club on 14 May 2021 in a league game against Guangzhou City F.C. in a 0-0 draw.

Career statistics
.

References

External links

2001 births
Living people
Chinese footballers
China youth international footballers
Association football midfielders
China League Two players
Chinese Super League players
Shandong Taishan F.C. players
Cangzhou Mighty Lions F.C. players